The Western Front is a 2010 American feature-length documentary film directed by debut director Zachary Iscol about his experience as a Marine officer in Iraq and how the US changed its tactics in Iraq over time, produced by Radha Agrawal and Zachary Iscol, and written by Zachary Iscol. The film, the first about the Iraq War made by someone who served in it, debuted at the 2010 TriBeCa Film Festival, and screened around the United States.

References

External links
 
 "Film Review: The Western Front", The Huffington Post
 Burstein, David D. (January 13, 2011). "Change Generation: Zach Iscol, Writer, Director, and Producer, The Western Front", Fast Company.

2010 films
2010 documentary films
American documentary films
Documentary films about the Iraq War
2010s English-language films
2010s American films